The following lists events from 1992 in China.

Incumbents
General Secretary of the Communist Party: Jiang Zemin
President: Yang Shangkun
Premier: Li Peng
Vice President: Wang Zhen 
Vice Premier: Yao Yilin

Governors  
 Governor of Anhui Province – Fu Xishou 
 Governor of Fujian Province – Jia Qinglin 
 Governor of Gansu Province – Jia Zhijie
 Governor of Guangdong Province – Zhu Senlin 
 Governor of Guizhou Province – Wang Zhaowen
 Governor of Hainan Province – Liu Jianfeng
 Governor of Hebei Province – Cheng Weigao
 Governor of Heilongjiang Province – Shao Qihui 
 Governor of Henan Province – Li Changchun 
 Governor of Hubei Province – Guo Shuyan 
 Governor of Hunan Province – Chen Bangzhu
 Governor of Jiangsu Province – Chen Huanyou  
 Governor of Jiangxi Province – Wu Guanzheng  
 Governor of Jilin Province – Wang Zhongyu then Gao Yan 
 Governor of Liaoning Province – Yue Qifeng 
 Governor of Qinghai Province – Jin Jipeng then Tian Chengping 
 Governor of Shaanxi Province – Bai Qingcai 
 Governor of Shandong Province – Zhao Zhihao 
 Governor of Shanxi Province – Wang Senhao then Hu Fuguo  
 Governor of Sichuan Province – Zhang Haoruo  
 Governor of Yunnan Province – Li Jiating 
 Governor of Zhejiang Province – Wan Xueyuan

Events

January
The Miss Chinese International Pageant 1992 was held on January 26 in Hong Kong.
Deng Xiaoping's southern tour

February

The Ürümqi bombings took place on February 5.
China participated in the 1992 Winter Olympics. China had three teams win Olympics medals, all of them silver, in various speed skating events.

July

A major plane crash took place in China.

August

At the 1992 Summer Olympics, China won 54 Olympic medals (16 Gold, 22 Silver, and 16 Bronze).
see also:China at the 1992 Summer Olympics
 Typhoon Omar begins

September

China competed at the 1992 Summer Paralympics.

October

Chinese Student Protection Act of 1992 was in effect starting October 9. This strengthened the role of Executive Order 12711, which was signed by George H. W. Bush in 1990.

November

 China Southern Airlines Flight 3943 crash

Births
 June 3 – Dilraba Dilmurat, actress, singer and model
 June 17 – Sun Yiwen, fencer

Deaths
 Zhao Xiu, politician (born 1921)

See also
List of Chinese films of 1992
China at the 1992 Winter Olympics
Chinese Taipei at the 1992 Summer Olympics

References

 
Years of the 20th century in China
China
1990s in China